Edvards Bidzāns (born 7 July 2005) is a Latvian professional motocross rider twice European champion. 

He competes with #57. In 2021 Bidzāns competes in the EMX250 class of the European championship.

Achievements

References

External links
 Edvards Bidzāns at MXGP
 

Living people
2005 births
Latvian motocross riders